Firestain is a layer of oxides that is visible on the surface of objects made of metal alloys containing copper when the object is heated, as by a jeweler heating a ring to apply solder during a repair. On copper-containing alloys of gold or of silver (such as sterling silver), it presents as a red or purple stain. This is because at high temperatures, oxygen mixes with the copper to form cuprous oxide and then cupric oxide, both of which disrupt the bright polished surface of the finished piece. 
It is sometimes referred to incorrectly as 'Firescale'; 'Firescale' is a flaky deposit that can occur on the surface of non ferrous metals when heated, on ferrous metals this is known as Mill scale.

Attempts to reduce the problem of firestain include preventative and curative ones. Firestain can be largely prevented by heating the object in an atmosphere in which the oxygen has been replaced with another combustive gas such as hydrogen or ammonia.

On the curative side, firestain can sometimes be removed by polishing, sanding, grinding, filing, wire brushing, and the like.  As the layer firestain is often not very deep, this approach, with sufficient effort and time, may be able to remove it.  However, this inevitably results in a loss of material to the piece, and will cause any fine details to the piece to be lost.  However, it does not involve the use of any special gasses or changes to the heating atmosphere around the piece.

As another cure, objects can also be "bombed" or electrostripped.  This involves placing them in a bath of a usually cyanide-based solution (sometimes nitric acid may be used instead, as well as other solutions) and applying a high-density electric current arranged so that the work piece functions as an anode.  Other approaches include electroplating the object with a layer of the principal metal of the alloy, as well as, for sterling and similar grades of silver, depletion silvering the piece, and for gold-copper alloys, a sodium dichromate pickle solution with a low percentage of sulfuric acid has been occasionally found effective.  These approaches, however, are temporary fixes in that all they do is cover up the firestain: over time, it will almost always reemerge through the thin layer of overlying metal deposit.  The only long-term techniques to prevent the appearance of firestain are through its time-consuming physical removal or preventing its formation in the first place, by using an oxygen-free environment (which is often expensive and requires specialized equipment), or by using an alloy which is resistant to firestain such as argentium.

See also
 Mill scale

References

Jewellery making
Silversmithing